Stajkovci is a village in the municipality of Gazi Baba, Republic of North Macedonia.

Demographics
According to the 2021 census, the village had a total of 4.394 inhabitants. Ethnic groups in the village include:

Macedonians 2.877
Albanians 1.117
Persons for whom data are taken from administrative sources 316
Romani 38
Serbs 26
Turks 6
Vlachs 1
Bosniaks 1
Others 12

References

External links

Villages in Gazi Baba Municipality
Albanian communities in North Macedonia